Selaginella longipinna, commonly known as the electric fern, is a plant in the spike moss family Selaginellaceae. It is endemic to northeastern Queensland, growing in rainforest and closed forest from Cooktown to near Mission Beach, including the Atherton Tablelands.

Conservation
This species is listed by the Queensland Department of Environment and Science as least concern. , it has not been assessed by the IUCN.

Gallery

References

External links
 
 
 View a map of historical sightings of this species at the Australasian Virtual Herbarium
 View observations of this species on iNaturalist
 View images of this species on Flickriver

longipinna
Endemic flora of Queensland
Taxa named by Otto Warburg
Plants described in 1900